Daniel Vasquez (born 21 July 1997) is a Chilean international rugby league footballer who plays as a . 

He has previously played for the Cronulla-Sutherland Sharks in the NRL.

Background
Vasquez is of Chilean descent. He played his junior rugby league for the Yarrawarrah Tigers.

Career

2020
Vasquez made his NRL debut in round 20 of the 2020 NRL season for Cronulla-Sutherland against the Canberra Raiders at Kogarah Oval.

References

External links
Sharks profile

1997 births
Living people
Australian rugby league players
Australian people of Chilean descent
Sportspeople of Chilean descent
Chile national rugby league team players
Cronulla-Sutherland Sharks players
Newtown Jets NSW Cup players
Rugby league players from Sydney
Rugby league props